Tara Beth Leach (born 1982) is an American evangelical pastor and author.

Education
Leach was born in 1982. She has said she first felt called to ministry while in high school but was told she couldn't be a pastor as a woman. She has a BA in youth ministry from Olivet Nazarene University and an MDiv from Northern Seminary, where she also worked as a teaching assistant for Scot McKnight.

Career
Leach was appointed Senior Pastor at First Church of the Nazarene of Pasadena ("PazNaz") in 2016, the first woman in the role. In 2017, she was the youngest female megachurch pastor in the United States. Since 2020, she has been a pastor at Christ Church of Oak Brook in Chicago.

Leach's first book, Emboldened, released in 2017, seeks to encourage women into Christian ministry. Her 2021 book Radiant suggests church leaders need to look at themselves rather than culture to explain the trend away from church attendance.

Personal life
Leach married in 2006 and has two sons.

Publications

References

External links
 Official website

Living people
1982 births
Olivet Nazarene University alumni
Northern Baptist Theological Seminary alumni
American Nazarene ministers
Women Christian clergy
Writers from Chicago
American women non-fiction writers
21st-century American women